Gandomabad (also Romanized as Gandomābād; also known as Gandam-Ab, Gandomāb, and Yeylāg-e Gandomābād) is a village in Shal Rural District, Shahrud District, Khalkhal County, Ardabil Province, Iran. At the 2006 census, its population was 78, in 20 families.

References 

Towns and villages in Khalkhal County